The Sunday Referee was a Sunday newspaper in the United Kingdom, founded in 1877 as The Referee, primarily covering sports news.

In the 1930s, considerable money was invested in an attempt to compete with the leading Sunday newspapers, and circulation reached 400,000, but in 1939 it was merged with the Sunday Chronicle.

In 1925/26 the paper gave front-page coverage for many weeks to apparent revelations by the writer Frank Power (real name Arthur Vectis Freeman) about the sinking of HMS Hampshire and the disappearance of Herbert Horatio Kitchener ten years previously.  These culminated with Power's sensational claim to have returned Kitchener's coffin to Britain, but on official examination it was found to be empty except for weighting material.

Dylan Thomas contributed several early poems to the newspaper.   During the 1930s columnists included Labour MP Ellen Wilkinson, the "maverick" Liberal politician William Mabane and the philosopher Bertrand Russell.  A column reviewing popular records was contributed by Christopher Stone, one of the first "disc jockeys".

The edition of May 24, 1936, had 24 broadsheet pages and cost twopence.  The publisher was the Sunday Referee Publishing Company of 17 Tudor Street, London EC4.  No edition number was carried.  The front page masthead carried the paper's title in Gothic script above the slogan "The national newspaper for all thinking men and women".  Seven pages showed the paper's continuing interest in sport but there was also a range of general news, features and show business gossip typical of the Sunday press.  One page, for instance, speculated with illustrations on which "beauties" would be the faces of the forthcoming BBC television service.

Editors

1932: Mark Goulden
1936: R. J. Minney

Source: David Butler and Jennie Freeman, British Political Facts, 1900-1960

References

Publications established in 1877
Publications disestablished in 1939
1877 establishments in the United Kingdom
Defunct Sunday newspapers published in the United Kingdom